Taravai is the second largest island in the Gambier Islands of French Polynesia, at 5.7 km2. Taravai is  about 1.5 km southwest of Mangareva and about 300 m north of the island of Angakauitai. Off its eastern shore lies the tiny rock Îlot Motu-o-ari.

The village named Agonoko is located near the main bay on the island's eastern shore. It has a population of 9. Former villages were Aga-nui (northwest) and Agakau-i-uta (southeast).

The Onemea archaeological site suggests sporadic occupation of the island around AD 950 with a possible continuous settlement since the 13th century.

Before the conversion to Christianity, the king of Taravai was a vassal to the king of Rikitea in Mangareva.

References

External links

Mangareva, Tahiti - Death of a People

Islands of the Gambier Islands